Partners is a Canadian thriller drama film, directed by Don Owen and released in 1976. The film stars Hollis McLaren as Heather Grey, the daughter of business magnate John Grey (Denholm Elliott); when she takes over leadership of the company after her father's death, she becomes a target for the romantic interests of Paul (Michael Margotta), a corporate spy for an American company eyeing a hostile takeover of the firm.

The Ontario Censor Board forced Owen to cut 35 seconds of a sex scene from the film.

The film has most commonly been analyzed as an allegory for Canadian nationalism. It was not well received by critics, but was a Canadian Film Award nominee for Best Feature Film at the 27th Canadian Film Awards in 1976.

References

External links
 

1976 films
1970s thriller drama films
Canadian thriller drama films
English-language Canadian films
Films directed by Don Owen
1970s business films
Films about inheritances
1970s English-language films
1970s Canadian films